Toni Seifert (born 14 April 1981, in Dresden) is a German rower.  As well as being a double world champion in the men's eight, he has twice competed for Germany at the Olympics in the men's coxless four.

References

External links
 

1981 births
Living people
Olympic rowers of Germany
Rowers at the 2008 Summer Olympics
Rowers at the 2012 Summer Olympics
Rowers from Dresden
World Rowing Championships medalists for Germany
German male rowers